The following is a list of national meetings of the League of Communists of Yugoslavia (SKJ). This article defines national meetings as party congresses and territorial conferences. The SKJ congress was the party's highest decision-making body. It convened 14 congresses before its dissolution, and ninth since taking power in 1945. According to the party rules, the party congress was to be convened by the SKJ Central Committee (CC) every fifth year. It functioned as a forum that approved party policy (such as the five-year plans), amended the party's charter and program, and elected the Central Committee. The party leadership, through the Political Report of the Central Committee, briefed the party on its work in the period since the last congress, and set out future goals for the period in between the next congress.

Keys

Convocations

References

General
Information on congresses, number of delegates, number of people elected to CCs, party membership, the individual who presented the Political Report and information on when the congress was convened can be found in these sources:

Bibliography
Articles and journals:

Specific

League of Communists of Yugoslavia
Politics of Yugoslavia
Yugoslavia, League of Communists